is a Japanese rapper, singer and songwriter who has been active since 1989.

Biography
Dohzi-T belonged to hip hop band "Zingi", formed in 1990. He debuted as a solo singer with the single "Shōnen A" (lit. "Boy A") on October 10, 2001. He associated with popular singers such as Shota Shimizu, Miliyah Kato and Hiromi Go. Since he has long career in Japan, he is called "Brother Dohzi" by other musicians. He is also known for his ability to find new singers. Dohzi-T and DJ Bass were featured in Ayumi Hamasaki's song "Nothing from Nothing", released by Nippon Columbia on September 21, 1995. However, Hamasaki soon left from the record label and became a pop singer under Avex Trax. In January 2008, he collaborated with Thelma Aoyama in a song "This Day" on her CD single "Soba ni Iru ne". In June 2008, he released his single "Mō Ichi do...", featuring Beni. It sold over two million ringtone downloads. Soon after "Mō Ichi Do..." released an album named 12 Love Stories including "Mō Ichi do..." as well as other collaboration songs with YU-A (from Foxxi misQ), Thelma Aoyama, JUJU and many more. The album was ranked as No. 3 on the weekly Oricon chart making it Dohzi-T's highest ranked album.

Discography

Albums
2007 August 29 - ONE MIC #33 on Oricon
2008 September 24 - 12 Love Stories #3 on Oricon
2009 December 16 - 4 ever
2010 December 9 - Gold
2011 November 30 - 12 Love Stories 2

Collaborations
2008 June 11 - Mō Ichi do... #7 on Oricon
2009 September 2 - Dakishimete feat. Dohzi-T (BENI - Bitter & Sweet) #5 on Oricon

References

External links
Official Website 

Japanese rappers
Japanese male pop singers
Living people
1969 births
Universal Music Japan artists